Carl Gustaf Birger Elmér (August 8, 1919 - November 8, 1999) was a Swedish military and intelligence officer. Until 1975 he was the head of the Swedish Armed Forces' secret intelligence agency, known as IB.

References

Notes 

1919 births
1999 deaths
Swedish military personnel